Patrick Saint-Denis (born 1975) is a Canadian composer based in Montreal. His works have been performed at music festivals in North America, Europe, and Asia. His composition, Les dits de Victoire, was awarded first prize in the SOCAN young composers competition in 2003 and the Jules Léger Prize for New Chamber Music in 2004. He also won the SOCAN competition in 2002 for his orchestral work, Le discours aux animaux and received honors for his Berceuse pour enfants perdus for chamber orchestra and female voice in 2003.

Born in Quebec City, Saint-Denis is a graduate of the Conservatoire de musique du Québec à Montréal, the Conservatoire de musique du Québec à Québec, and the Royal Conservatory of The Hague. Among his principal teachers are Louis Andriessen, Clarence Barlow, and Serge Provost. His works combine music, live audio-visual processing and robotics.

References

External links
Patrick Saint-Denis his website
Biography of Patrick Saint-Denis at the Société de musique contemporaine du Québec
Complete Catalogue Holdings for Patrick Saint-Denis at Canadian Music Centre

1975 births
Living people
Royal Conservatory of The Hague alumni
Canadian male composers
Conservatoire de musique du Québec à Montréal alumni
Conservatoire de musique du Québec à Québec alumni
Jules Léger Prize for New Chamber Music winners
Canadian classical composers
Pupils of Louis Andriessen